The James Madison Dukes men's basketball team is the intercollegiate men's basketball program representing James Madison University in Harrisonburg, Virginia. The school, a member of Division I of the National Collegiate Athletic Association, joined the Sun Belt Conference on July 1, 2022 after having been a member of the Colonial Athletic Association since that league's establishment in 1979. The Dukes are led by head coach Mark Byington. The Dukes play their home games at the on-campus Atlantic Union Bank Center which seats 8,500 fans and opened in November 2020.

History
The James Madison Dukes men's basketball team was founded in 1945, but was not a fully developed program until the late 1960s as James Madison University became a fully coeducational institution. The 1969–1970 season was the first as a varsity intercollegiate program. The Dukes were led by Cleve Branscum during the team's first two seasons, compiling a record of 20–17. The program was guided by new Administrative Director Dean Ehlers for the 1971–1972 season. Ehlers hired Lou Campanelli following the season, but remained at James Madison as the A.D. until 1993.

Lou Campanelli era
Taking over as the James Madison head coach in 1972, Lou Campanelli led the Dukes program for thirteen years (1972-1985). Campanelli coached the Dukes to two NCAA Division II basketball tournaments and then three NCAA Division I basketball tournaments after the school transitioned from Division II to Division I. In the Dukes' first ever appearance in the NCAA Division I tournament in 1981, Campanelli coached the team to a win over Georgetown. The Dukes would win a game in each of the Dukes’ following appearances in the NCAA Division I tournament under Campanelli, and lost by two points to eventual national champions University of North Carolina in the second round of the 1982 tournament.

Lou Campanelli was hired as the head coach at California in 1985. Campanelli finished at James Madison with a record of 238–118.

John Thurston era
John Thurston was hired as the fourth head coach of the James Madison Dukes men's basketball team in 1985. Thurston had previously served as an assistant coach under Campanelli with the Dukes since 1975. Thurston successfully turned the program around in his second season at the helm, guiding the Dukes to a 20–10 record, a berth in the National Invitation Tournament, and was named Colonial Athletic Association Coach of the Year. However, with a 6–11 start to the 1988 season, James Madison University President Ronald E. Carrier announced that Thurston's contract would not be renewed at the end of the season and Thurston resigned hours later. The Dukes replaced Thurston with interim head coach Tom McCorry to finish the 1988 season.

Lefty Driesell era
In 1988, the Dukes hired former Davidson and Maryland head coach Lefty Driesell to lead the program. Driesell led the Dukes for nine seasons, compiling a record of 159–111 and taking the Dukes to the NCAA tournament in 1994.

Sherman Dillard era
In 1997, James Madison hired Sherman Dillard to lead the men's basketball program. Sherman Dillard played basketball at James Madison under Lou Campanelli from 1973 to 1978. Prior to accepting the position at JMU, he had been the coach at Indiana State. He led the Dukes through the 2004 season, guiding the program to one regular season title in 2000 and compiling a record of 93–106.

Dean Keener era
The Dukes hired Dean Keener in 2004 to be the program's next men's basketball head coach. Keener came from Georgia Tech, where he was an assistant on the 2004 National Runner-Up team. He had also been a one time assistant coach at JMU under Sherman Dillard for the 1999–2000 season.

Under Keener, the Dukes compiled a record of 31–85. During the 2008 season, Kenner resigned as the head coach, but he led the team through the end of the season.

Matt Brady era
James Madison hired Matt Brady to be the head coach of the men's basketball program in 2008. In his first season, Brady led the Dukes to an 18-win regular season and earned the program's first postseason berth since 1994 in the newly created CollegeInsider.com Postseason Tournament.

Under Brady in 2013, the Dukes won their first CAA tournament since 1994, earning a berth in the NCAA tournament. As a 16 seed, the Dukes defeated Long Island in the First Four before being defeated by Indiana in the second round.

Matt Brady led the Dukes to a share of the regular season CAA title in 2015 but the Dukes did not win the CAA Tournament and were invited to the CIT tournament. Brady was fired following the 2016 season, despite winning 21 games.

Louis Rowe era
In 2016, James Madison hired JMU men's basketball alumnus and former assistant coach Louis Rowe to be the program's tenth men's basketball coach. Rowe led the Dukes for four seasons before being let go at the end of the 2020 season. Under Rowe, the Dukes compiled a record of 43–85.

Mark Byington era
In March 2020, James Madison hired Mark Byington to lead the Dukes men's basketball team. Before coming to JMU, Byington was the head coach at Georgia Southern. In his first season at JMU, Mark Byington lead the Dukes to a share of the regular season title, the team's first since the 2015 season.

In the first season of his tenure at James Madison, the Dukes opened their new on-campus arena, the Atlantic Union Bank Center.

On December 7, 2021, Byington's Dukes defeated Virginia for the first time in program history in front of a sold out home crowd.

Rivalries
Historically, James Madison's rivals had been in-state members of the Colonial Athletic Association: William & Mary, VCU, George Mason, Old Dominion, and Richmond. Now members of the Sun Belt Conference, the Dukes only remaining conference rival from the old CAA is Old Dominion. However, James Madison has continued to schedule its former conference rivals in non-conference play. James Madison and Old Dominion's basketball rivalry is also a part of their all-sports rivalry known as the Royal Rivalry.

James Madison vs. In-State NCAA Division I Schools

James Madison vs. Sun Belt Members
This reflects the Dukes' record against the current Sun Belt Conference's membership as of the 2022–23 season.

James Madison vs. CAA Members
James Madison also maintained competitive series against the other members of the Colonial Athletic Association during their tenure in the CAA.

Source:

Postseason results

NCAA Division I tournament results
The Dukes have appeared in the NCAA Division I tournament five times. Their combined record is 4–5.

NCAA Division II tournament results
The Dukes have appeared in the NCAA Division II tournament twice. Their record is 0–3.

NIT results
The Dukes have appeared in the National Invitation Tournament (NIT) five times. Their combined record is 0–5.

CBI results
The Dukes have appeared in the College Basketball Invitational (CBI) once. Their record is 0–1.

CIT results
The Dukes have appeared in the CollegeInsider.com Postseason Tournament (CIT) twice. Their record is 2–2.

References

External links